Constituent Assembly elections were held in Bulgaria between 1 and 30 January 1879, although only 117 of the 231 members of the Assembly were elected during this period. It followed the country's liberation from the Ottoman Empire, and saw the Conservative Party and the Liberal Party emerge as the two main parties. The Assembly was opened on 10 February, and convened in Veliko Tarnovo to ratify the country's first constitution, known as the Tarnovo Constitution, on 16 April. The parliament was later transferred to Sofia, which became the capital of the country.

Following debates between the Conservatives, who were in favour of a bicameral parliament, and the Liberals, who supported a unicameral system, the new constitution made provision for a unicameral National Assembly, which was elected later in the year.

Elected members
Ivancho Hadzhipenchovich

References

Bulgaria
1879 in Bulgaria
Elections in Bulgaria
January 1879 events